The Man Who Skied Down Everest is a documentary about Yuichiro Miura, a Japanese alpinist who skied down Mount Everest in 1970. The film was produced by Canadian film maker F. R. "Budge" Crawley. Miura skied 2,000 m (6,600 ft) in two minutes and 20 seconds and fell 400 m (1,320 ft) down the steep Lhotse face from the Yellow Band just below the South Col. He used a large parachute to slow his descent. He came to a full stop just 76 m (250 ft) from the edge of a bergschrund, a large, deep crevasse where the ice shears away from the stagnant ice on the rock face and begins to move downwards as a glacier.

The ski descent was the objective of The Japanese Everest Skiing Expedition 1970. Six Sherpa members were killed during the expedition, as well as a Japanese member who died of a heart attack. At the same time, another independent Japanese expedition (called The Japanese Mount Everest Expedition 1970) undertook a combined ascent of (a) the normal route, including Naomi Uemura who made the summit, and (b) the first attempt at the South-West Face, the tall black face on the movie poster with the Y-shaped snowy gully. Two members of this second expedition died.

Crawley won the Academy Award for Best Documentary Feature for this picture. The Academy Film Archive preserved The Man Who Skied Down Everest in 2010.

See also
1970 Mount Everest disaster

References

External links

1975 films
English-language Canadian films
Mountaineering films
Best Documentary Feature Academy Award winners
Films directed by Lawrence Schiller
Canadian sports documentary films
1975 documentary films
Films about Mount Everest
1970s English-language films
1970s Canadian films